Loïc Nottet (born 10 April 1996) is a Belgian singer, songwriter and dancer. He began his career as a singer in the third season of The Voice Belgique in 2014 and represented Belgium in the Eurovision Song Contest 2015, where he placed fourth with his song "Rhythm Inside".

After the contest, he released "Million Eyes", the first single from his debut album Selfocracy, which later topped the charts in Belgium, reached number eight in France and number twenty in Switzerland. His second studio album Sillygomania was released on 29 May 2020.

Music career

2013–2015: The Voice Belgique and Eurovision Song Contest
Nottet auditioned for The Voice Belgique and reached second place in the final of the third season, behind the winner Pagna. He was in the team of B.J. Scott. He cited Imagine Dragons, Lana Del Rey, Sia and Dua Lipa as his inspirations.

List of songs performed on The Voice Belgique

On 3 November 2014, Belgium's French-language broadcaster, Radio Télévision Belge Francophone (RTBF), announced Nottet as the Belgian representative for the Eurovision Song Contest 2015 to be held in Vienna, Austria. On 10 March 2015, "Rhythm Inside", his entry for the Eurovision Song Contest 2015, was presented (co-written by his Voice mentor). The song went to number one on both the Flanders and Wallonia Ultratop charts. Performing in the first semi final of the competition, Nottet was successful in progressing to the final, coming second in his semi final with 149 points. During the Jury Final (following Australia), he could be barely seen on stage due to heavy use of smoke machines and pyrotechnics from the Australian Act. His delegation was rumoured to have lodged a complaint about this, saying that it would affect part of their final score. While they requested to perform again, this was apparently denied, instead telling juries to disregard the smoke. In the Grand Final, the Belgian entry scored a total of 217 points leaving "Rhythm Inside" in fourth position overall, giving Belgium its first top five placement since 2003. It received the maximum 12 points from three countries; Netherlands, France and Hungary. The song was certified Platinum for selling 30,000 copies in Belgium. Nottet has released three different music videos for Rhythm Inside (including one called the "Alice in Nightmareland" version). After the contest, "Rhythm Inside" reached the top ten in the Austrian, Lithuanian and Russian Music Charts, achieving top 20 in Finland, Iceland and Sweden and also charting in Australia, UK, France, Switzerland and many more European countries. On 24 October 2015, he took part in and won the sixth season of the French TV show Danse avec les stars.

List of performances on Danse avec les stars (season 6)

1.With Candice Pascal instead of Denitsa Ikonomova.
1.Judges note + Public note.
2.Duo with EnjoyPhoenix & Christophe.
3.Trio with Silvia Notargiacomo.
4.Trio with Marie-Claude Pietragalla (who didn't note this dance).

List of performances on Danse avec les stars (after season 6)

1.Trio with Laurent Maistret & Denitsa Ikonomova.
2.Special prime after season 7.
3.Trio with Azize Diabaté & Denitsa Ikonomova.

2016–2017: Selfocracy
Nottet's single "Million Eyes", part of his first album, was released on 27 October 2016. The video was filmed on 5 October 2016. Nottet announced the album would feature a concept, different characters and several music videos. The song charted at number two on the Wallonia Ultratop chart and number two in France. The song was certified gold in Belgium and France. On the evening of 1 March 2017, Nottet announced his debut album, titled Selfocracy. The album was released on 31 March and managed to top the chart in Belgian Albums (Ultratop Wallonia). It also charted at number three in Ultratop Flanders, number eight in France and number twenty in Switzerland.

On 22 and 23 April 2017, Nottet presented his first concerts after the release of Selfocracy. He performed two sold-out concerts in the Ancienne Belgique (l'AB) in Brussels.

Nottet won the Best Belgian Act category at the 2017 MTV Europe Music Awards which aired on 12 November 2017.

Throughout 2017, Nottet toured in Belgium, the UK, France, Germany and more in support of Selfocracy. The tour finished in early August 2018.

2018–present: Candy and Sillygomania 
In October 2019, Nottet announced Candy, a Halloween-themed extended play. The EP was released on 31 October, alongside a musical short film of the same name, which premiered the same day on YouTube.

Nottet's second studio album, Sillygomania, was released on 29 May 2020.

On November 9 in 2022, he released the song Mélodrame on all streaming platforms.

Discography

 Selfocracy (2017)
 Sillygomania (2020)

See also
 Edward Bruce (music executive)

References

External links

  

Living people
1996 births
Eurovision Song Contest entrants for Belgium
Eurovision Song Contest entrants of 2015
Danse avec les stars winners
21st-century Belgian male singers
21st-century Belgian singers
Walloon musicians